Richard Matthew Burwell (born January 23, 1940) is an American former professional baseball pitcher. The native of Alton, Illinois, attended Illinois Wesleyan University.

Burwell's pro career lasted for seven years (1959–1965), all in the Cubs' organization. He appeared in a total of five major league games, including one start, his  maiden MLB appearance on September 13, 1960, against the Cincinnati Reds at Crosley Field. Burwell allowed six earned runs in five innings pitched on six hits (including home runs by Gordy Coleman and Eddie Kasko) and three bases on balls. He left the game for a pinch hitter with the Cubs trailing 6–4. However, he was not charged with the loss: the Cubs tied the score at six after Burwell's exit, and the decisive run in Chicago's 8–6 defeat was charged to relief pitcher Don Elston. 

In Burwell's two late-season big-league trials, he allowed 17 hits and 11 bases on balls in 13 innings pitched, with one strikeout. He did not earn a decision and posted an earned run average of 6.59.

References

External links

1940 births
Living people
Amarillo Gold Sox players
Baseball players from Illinois
Burlington Bees players
Chicago Cubs players
Dallas–Fort Worth Spurs players
Fort Worth Cats players
Illinois Wesleyan Titans baseball players
Lancaster Red Roses players
Major League Baseball pitchers
Paris Lakers players
People from Alton, Illinois
St. Cloud Rox players
Salt Lake City Bees players
Wenatchee Chiefs players